The 1910 Georgia Bulldogs football team represented the Georgia Bulldogs of the University of Georgia during the 1910 college football season. The Bulldogs completed the season with a 6–2–1 record. The team started with two tune-up games that Georgia won  by a combined score of 180–0. The Bulldogs notched victories over Alabama and Georgia Tech, ending a five-game losing streak to Tech.  Georgia did lose to rival Auburn, but the first season under new head coach Bill Cunningham was certainly an improvement over prior years.

The 1910 season marked the debut of more than a new coach, it also marked the debut of Bob McWhorter, one of the most notable players in Georgia history.  McWhorter was a four-year letterman, lettering first in 1910.  He played halfback.

Schedule

References

Georgia
Georgia Bulldogs football seasons
Georgia Bulldogs football